The 2014 Plymouth City Council election took place on 22 May 2014 to elect members of Plymouth City Council in England. This was on the same day as other local elections. The election was won by the Labour Party, who maintained their overall majority. The UK Independence Party gained representation on the council for the first time, and this was the only election in which the party won seats in Plymouth.

Background

Plymouth City Council held local elections on 22 May 2014 as part of the 2014 local elections. The council elects its councillors in thirds, with a third being up for election every year for three years, with no election in the fourth year. Councillors defending their seats in this election were previously elected in 2010. In that election, eleven Conservative candidates and eight Labour candidates were elected. As the previous election had coincided with a general election, sitting councillors were elected with a citywide turnout of 62%.

Ahead of the election, the council was split between the Labour Party and the Conservative Party, with Labour holding a narrow overall majority.

Labour gained a Southway seat in 2013 in a by-election after elected Conservative councillor Tom Browne resigned. As Browne had been elected in 2010, winning Labour councillor Jonny Morris was up for re-election in 2014.

Overall results

|-
| colspan=2 style="text-align: right; margin-right: 1em" | Total
| style="text-align: right;" | 19
| colspan=5 |
| style="text-align: right;" | 57,936
| style="text-align: right;" | 

Note: All changes in vote share are in comparison to the corresponding 2010 election.

The Labour Party kept their majority on the council.

After the previous election, the  composition of the council was:

After this election, the composition of the council was:

Ward results
Plymouth City Council maintains records of past election results.

Asterisks denote sitting councillors seeking re-election.

Budshead

Compton

Devonport

Drake

Efford and Lipson

Eggbuckland

Ham

Honicknowle

Moor View

Peverell

Plympton Chaddlewood

Plympton St Mary

Plymstock Dunstone

Plymstock Radford

Southway

St Budeaux

Stoke

St Peter and the Waterfront

Sutton and Mount Gould

Aftermath 
Turnout in this election fell to 37%, compared to 62% when the defending councillors were last elected. Following this election, the Labour group had a majority of councillors. This meant that Labour group leader Tudor Evans remained the leader of Plymouth City Council. The UK Independence Party won seats on the council for the first time, and came second in several seats in the city with close results in St Budeaux and Plymstock Radford wards.

References

2014 English local elections
2014
2010s in Devon